The Dutch National Students Association (ISO; lit. "Intercity Student Consultation") is one of two national representations and spokesman of students in the Netherlands at the Ministry of Education, Culture and Science, VSNU (Association of Universities in the Netherlands), Association of Higher Professional Education, DUO, etc.
The purpose of ISO is to improve the quality of higher education, protection of students' interests and representation of 688.000 students in higher education.

ISO is a full member of the European Students' Union.

Member organizations
 Academic Affairs Council University College Roosevelt - University College Roosevelt
 ASVA Studentenunie - Universiteit van Amsterdam
 Lijst Calimero - Rijksuniversiteit Groningen (homepage)
 CMR Avans Hogescholen - Avans Hogeschool
 Central Student Council (CSR) - Universiteit van Amsterdam
 Christen Studenten Fractie (CSI) - Wageningen University
 SMR Christelijke Hogeschool Ede - Christelijke Hogeschool Ede
 DOPE - Universiteit Maastricht
 EUR Universiteitsraad - Erasmus University Rotterdam
 Fontys studentenraad - Fontys Hogescholen
 Front studentenfractie - Universiteit van Tilburg
 Groep-één - Eindhoven University of Technology
 CMR HAN - Hogeschool van Arnhem en Nijmegen
 Hanze Studentbelangen Vereniging - Hanzehogeschool Groningen
 Hogeschoolraad van de Haagse Hogeschool - Haagse Hogeschool
 CMR HvA - Hogeschool van Amsterdam
 HMR Inholland - Hogeschool Inholland
 Vereniging MUST - Hogeschool Utrecht
 ORAS - Delft University of Technology
 CMR Rotterdam - Hogeschool Rotterdam
 SAM - Universiteit van Tilburg
 GMR Saxion - Saxion Enschede
 SGL - Leiden University
 SIAM - Radboud University Nijmegen
 S.O.G. - University of Groningen
 CMR Stenden Hogeschool - Stenden Hogeschool
 Studentenraad Open Universiteit Nederland - Open Universiteit
 UReka - Universiteit Twente
 UU-raad - Universiteit Utrecht
 VeSte - Wageningen University
 VSSD - Delft University of Technology
 VUSO/LSO - Vrije Universiteit
 CMR Hogeschool Windesheim - Windesheim

External links
http://www.iso.nl

Groups of students' unions
Student organisations in the Netherlands